North is a surname. Notable people with the surname include:

 Aaron North (born 1979), American guitarist
 Alan North (1920–2000), American actor
 Alan North (motorcyclist) (born 1953), South African motorcyclist
 Alex North (1910–1991), American composer
 Alfred North (disambiguation), any of several people of the same name
 Andy North (born 1950), American professional golfer and television commentator
 Anita North (born 1963), British clay-pigeon shooter
 Anthony North, Australian judge
 Astrid North (1973–2019), German soul singer
 Baron North, a title in the Peerage of England
 Barry North (born 1959), Royal Air Force officer
 Billy North (born 1948), American baseball player
 Brad North (born 1985), American soccer player
 Brady North (born 1991), American baseball coach
 Brownlow North (1741–1820), British bishop
 Brownlow North (evangelist) (1810–1875), British evangelist
 Chandra North (born 1973), American model
 Charles North (disambiguation), any of several people of the same name
 Christopher North (disambiguation), any of several people of the same name
 Dakota North (speedway rider) (born 1991), Australian motorcycle speedway rider
 Danny North (born 1987), British football player
 David North (disambiguation), any of several people of the same name
 Delia North, South African statistician
 Dominic North (born 1983), British ballet dancer
 Douglas M. North, American academic administrator
 Douglass North (1920−2015), American economist
 Dudley North (disambiguation), any of several people of the same name
 Edmund H. North (1911–1990), American screenwriter
 Edward North, 1st Baron North (c. 1496–1564), English nobleman
 Eustace North (1868–1925), England international rugby player
 F. J. North (18891968), British geologist and museum curator
 Ford North (1830–1913), British judge
 Francis North (disambiguation), any of several people of the same name
 Frank North (1840–1885), United States Army officer
 Frank North (American football) (1924-2017), American football coach
 Frank William North (1871–1925), Anglican clergyman who spent his career in Russia and Finland
 Freddie North (born 1939), American singer
 Frederic North (1866–1921), British sportsman and public servant
 Frederick North, Lord North (1732–1792), British prime minister
 Freya North (born 1967), British writer
 Gary North (disambiguation), any of several people of the same name
 George North (born 1992), Welsh rugby player
 George North (disambiguation), any of several other people of the same name
 Gerald North (born 1938), American climatologist
 Harold North
 Heather North (1945–2017), American actress
 Henry North (disambiguation), any of several people of the same name
 Ian North (1952–2021), American musician, producer and painter
 Ian North (artist), Australian artist, co-founder of the Experimental Art Foundation in Adelaide in 1974
 J. J. North (born 1964), American actress
 Jade North (born 1982), Australian football player
 Jay North (born 1951), American actor
 Jessica Nelson North (1891–1988), American writer
 Jim North (1919–2003), American football player
 Joe North (1895–1955), British football player
 John North (disambiguation), any of several people of the same name
 Jordan North (born 1990), English radio and television presenter
 Kenda North (born 1951), American photographer
 Larry North, American insurgent
 Lawrence North (1903–1980), New Zealand Baptist minister
 Lindsay North (1911–1984), Australian politician
 Lowell North (1929–2019), American sailor
 Marianne North (1830 – 1890), English botanical artist
 Marcus North (born 1979), Australian cricketer
 Michael North (professor), American literary critic
 Mike North, 20th-century American sports talk radio show host
 Mikey North (b. 1986), British actor
 Moira North, American figure skating choreographer
 Ned North, pen name used by Edwin North McClellan
 Neil North (1932–2007), British actor
 Nigel North (born 1954), English lutenist
 Nolan North (born 1970), American voice actor
 Oliver North (born 1943), former US military figure, television journalist
 Oliver Danson North (1887–1968), British automobile designer
 Peter North (disambiguation), any of several people of the same name
 Phil North (born 1965), Welsh cricketer
 Philip North (born 1966), British priest
 Richard North (disambiguation), any of several people of the same name
 Robert North (1884–1976), American vaudeville performer and film producer
 Robyn North (born 1983), British actress
 Roger North (disambiguation), any of several people of the same name
 Roy North (born 1941), British actor
 Russ North (born 1965), British singer
 Ryan North (born 1980), Canadian writer
 S. N. D. North, American statistician
 Sheree North (1932–2005), American dancer and actress
 Stacey North (born 1964), British football player
 Stephen North (born 1965), British actor
 Sterling North (1906–1974), American children's writer
 Thomas North (1535–1604), English translator
 Tye Milwaukie North (born 1972), American musician
 Walter E. North, American diplomat
 Walter Harper North, American jurist
 Walter H. North, American politician
 William North (disambiguation), any of several people of the same name

English-language surnames